William Holt (1897–1977) was born in Todmorden, West Yorkshire, the eldest son of a coal merchant.  At the age of 13, whilst working in a cotton weaving shed, he taught himself several languages. Holt travelled extensively and had numerous jobs, including deck hand, stunt man, language teacher, newspaper correspondent (during the Spanish Civil War) and BBC broadcaster.

In 1920 he married Florence Silman and they eventually had four children. He became active in local political struggles in the late 1920s, becoming the only Communist to be elected to the Town Council. His protests against the Means Test led him to spend nine months in Wakefield Prison. Billy Holt also pioneered a motorised library service and developed a 'model' farm.  At the age of 66 he made a trip across Europe on Trigger, an aging ex-rag-and-bone horse he had rescued.  A Yorkshire TV documentary of his life was made in 1969, The All or Nothing Man.

As an artist Holt worked in a bold, dramatic style.  His huge visionary paintings Christ Overcoming Space and Eternity Diadem, and Consider the Lilies (depicting hymn-singing weavers) attempt to show the triumph of man's spirit over mass production. But it is as a writer that he is most widely known.

During his life he received praise from Phyllis Bentley, J. B. Priestley, H. G. Wells, Glyn Hughes, Mike Harding, Ted Hughes and others.

Published works
Autobiographical writings
Under a Japanese Parasol (1933)
I Was a Prisoner (1934)
I Haven't Unpacked (1939)
I Still Haven't Unpacked (1953)
Trigger in Europe (1966)
Novels:
Backwaters (1934)
The Price of Adventure (1934)
The Weaver's Knot (1956)
The Wizard of Whirlaw (1959)

Further reading
 Gilmour, David. Todmorden Cameos. Millennium, 1999.
 TV documentary, The All or Nothing Man.  Yorkshire Television, 1969.
 Who's Who? Todmorden Historical Almanacks.

References

External links
 At Home With William Holt And His Horse Trigger c.1970 Produced by Sam Hanna, Burnley (Vimeo - North West Film Archive)

1897 births
1977 deaths
English autobiographers
20th-century English painters
English male painters
People from Todmorden
English male novelists
20th-century English novelists
Communist writers
Communist Party of Great Britain members
Proletarian literature